Weird: The Al Yankovic Story (Original Soundtrack) is the soundtrack album to the 2022 film Weird: The Al Yankovic Story, a satirical biopic, loosely based on the life and career of comedy musician "Weird Al" Yankovic, who is also credited as executive producer and co-writer of the film. The film, co-written and directed by Eric Appel (in his directorial debut), stars Daniel Radcliffe as Yankovic, along with Evan Rachel Wood, Rainn Wilson, Toby Huss, Arturo Castro, and Julianne Nicholson in supporting roles.

The album features 46 tracks in total, consisting mostly Yankovic's early songs that were re-recorded for the album, new renditions of several of his parody songs, and original score compositions by Leo Birenberg and Zach Robinson, accompanying the remainder of it. Yankovic's original song "Now You Know" specially recorded for the film (in the closing credits) and album, was released as a single on November 4, 2022. The song was recorded in order to be eligible for a Best Original Song nomination at the 95th Academy Awards. But the prospects of an Academy Award campaign was dropped as its distributor Roku denied a limited theatrical release plans for the film.

The same day, the album was released as a companion to the film by Legacy Recordings, in conjunction with its streaming premiere on The Roku Channel, though music enthusiasts mentioned it as a "surprise album" from Yankovic. It was released in CD on January 27, 2023 and a two-disc vinyl edition of the soundtrack is set for release on May 19, 2023.

Production

Background 
The original score is who composed by Leo Birenberg and Zach Robinson, most notable for their work in Cobra Kai (2018–present). Birenberg and Robinson discussed the film's music with Eric Appel and "Weird Al" Yankovic. Yankovic interacted with the crew through Zoom due to his participation in global tours, while scoring the film. Birenberg said on his creative collaboration with Yankovic, as "he's an awesome guy to work with, because he's obviously so creative and such a visionary, but he also knows how much direction to give and to let people do their thing to make it as good as possible". On doing parody music, Robinson added that "you almost 'cue' the audience where to laugh a little bit. So the way you'll structure a specific build or a specific hit will be designed to tee up a punchline that exists in the on-camera work. And when you just play it straight, you're still hitting things and still building, but you're doing it in a way that you want the audience to be like, 'Yeah, I'm in it. This is a sweet action movie.' That's the difference."

Composition 
The accordion was used as the primary instrument in the score, played by Cory Pesaturo. On using an accordion for the themes, Robinson explained that the process was "insanely difficult" as the player needs to know the aspects of an accordion and piano, and put them while constantly bellowing, as "that's what makes the sound, is the air being pushed out through these reeds that are in it ... your brain needs to be doing these three totally independent things and putting them together to execute the music." Pesaturo played the accordion for all themes, instead of solo violins, and flute, so that a lot of emotional themes heard will have an accordion. Robinson added that Yankovic new various varieties of accordions, from various countries that have different sounds of different genres. In addition to the accordion, Birenberg and Robinson used orchestral music to complement the score, but also had accordion playing in some pieces.

According to Birenberg and Robinson, some of the sequences, including the reconciliation between Yankovic and his dad, Yankovic's speech, his meeting with Dr. Demento and the dinner fight sequence were described as "fun to score". The theme for Al's speech was the first cue he had written and presented for the film, which was appreciated by Appel for the unique composition and style. The diner fight had a John Wick-styled musical score, which was played by accordion, which Robinson described it as the "fun thing to do so". For the first meeting between Yankovic and Madonna, Robinson had preferred his version of Yankovic's theme, vocalised by Madonna, that resulted in a "romantic", "over-the-top" piano piece which was scored, to do "a funny Madonna vibe".

Dr. Demento and Al's meeting included an emotional and orchestral score, whose version had "comedy cues". The original version, is a "very sincere, emotional piece of music that has a little bit more of hope and uplifting feeling to it", which was not considered. The version is a "goofy comedic cue" played over the weirdness of Demento instead of the sincerity and emotion that Appel demanded. Both Birenberg and Robinson wanted a sincere approach to the sequences, as similar to Robert Zemeckis' directorials in the 1990s.

Sound design and mixing 
Tony Solis mixed and re-recorded the film score, while Anthony Vanchure and Michael James Gallagher, respecitvely edited, supervised and designed the sounds to blend Yankovic's music with Birenberg and Robinson's underscore and sound effects. Solis was reminded by Yankovic and Appel, to mix the live performance sequences "to be more authentic", whether on outdoor and indoor arena performance. Yankovic also re-recorded the parody songs, with Solis mixing them in Dolby Atmos music, as "it is a big surround sound film" and gave him individual stems of the music, and the songs played throughout the film, which gave him access "to weave the music into making it right for the space, making the accordion sound awesome, and making drums and bass and all of his vocals sound exactly right to the space."

Both Gallagher and Vanchure discussed about the sound design in a music-themed film with Yankovic, who provided instructions on producing each sound uniquely. Vanchure called it as his biggest challenge of any film as "when you are doing audio for film because you have music, and that is helping tell the story, and then you also have the sound effects that we are using to help tell the story and with this movie, not only do we have Weird Al songs, but we also have a fantastic score by our composers, and it also is dependent on seeing how you mix a scene you need to keep playing it back a couple of times and go, “all right, what are we feeling, what’s carrying the scene more.”"

Track listing

Credits 
Credits adapted from CD liner notes.

 Album producer: Rick Derringer
 Sound engineer: Tony Papa
 Mixing: Santa Monica Sound Recorders
 Additional vocalist: Bob Tebow
 Background vocalists: Andrea Robinson, Lisa Popeil, Pattie Brooks, Petsye Powell
 Bass: Steve Jay
 Bongos: Joel Miller
 Clarinet: Joel Peskin
 Drums and percussions: Jon "Bermuda" Schwartz
 Guitar: Jim "Kimo" West, Rick Derringer
 Mandolin: Rick Derringer
 Saxophone: Jimmy Z
 Synthesiser: Pat Regan, "Weird Al" Yankovic
 Trumpet: Warren Luening
 Tuba: Jim Self

Charts

Release history

Accolades

References 

2022 soundtrack albums
"Weird Al" Yankovic soundtracks
"Weird Al" Yankovic compilation albums
Comedy soundtracks
Legacy Recordings soundtracks
2022 compilation albums
Legacy Recordings compilation albums